Larry Tye is an American non-fiction author and journalist known for his biographies of notable Americans including Edward Bernays (1999) Satchel Paige (2009), Robert F. Kennedy (2016) and Joseph McCarthy (2020).

From 1986 to 2001, Tye was a reporter at The Boston Globe, where his primary beat was medicine. He also served as the Globe's environmental reporter, roving national writer, investigative reporter and sports writer. Before that, he was the environmental reporter at The Courier-Journal in Louisville, Kentucky, and covered government and business at The Anniston Star in Anniston, Alabama.

Tye was a Nieman Fellow at Harvard University in 1993–1994 and has won a series of major newspaper awards, including the Livingston Award for Young Journalists and the Edward J. Meeman Award for Environmental Journalism.

Two of Tye's books, one on the Pullman porters and another on electroconvulsive therapy, have been adapted into documentary films. Sony and Hulu are making his biography of Robert Kennedy into a limited TV series, with Chris Pine due to play Kennedy.

Tye won a Goldsmith Research Prize from Harvard's Kennedy School of Government, an Alicia Patterson Fellowship, a Rockefeller Foundation Bellagio Residency, and research grants from the Newberry Library, Gilder Lehrman Institute, and the Eisenhower and Truman libraries. His books have won awards, including the National Alliance on Mental Illness's highest honor for one on mental illness co-authored with Kitty Dukakis. Tye's biography of Satchel Paige was named a New York Times Notable Book, and won two prizes—the Casey Award and Seymour Medal—as best baseball book of 2009.

The Wall Street Journal wrote that Tye’s latest book, Demagogue: The Life and Long Shadow of Senator Joe McCarthy,  was “the fullest account yet” of McCarthy and “the rigor of his research ensures he goes far beyond the caricature to give us a portrait of nuance and depth.” NPR reported that the book also, “draws a parallel between McCarthy's tactics and President Trump's divisive rhetoric.”

Additionally, Tye is director of the Boston-based Health Coverage Fellowship, which each year trains 10 American medical journalists on better covering issues in this field.

Education and teaching 
Tye, who graduated from Brown University, taught journalism at Boston University, Northeastern University and Tufts University.

Works
 The Father of Spin: Edward L. Bernays and the Birth of Public Relations. New York: Crown Publishing Group (1998). .
 Homelands: Portraits of the New Jewish Diaspora. New York: Henry Holt & Company (2001). .
 Rising From the Rails: Pullman Porters and the Making of the Black Middle Class. New York: Henry Holt & Company (2004). .
 Shock: The Healing Power of Electroconvulsive Therapy, co-written by Kitty Dukakis. Avery Publishing (2007). .
Satchel: The Life and Times of an American Legend. New York: Random House (2009). .
Superman: The High-Flying History of America's Most Enduring Hero. New York: Random House (2012). .
Bobby Kennedy: The Making of a Liberal Icon. New York: Random House (2016). .
 Demagogue: The Life and Long Shadow of Senator Joe McCarthy. New York: Houghton Mifflin (2020). .

Honors and awards
 2009 Casey Award for Satchel: The Life and Times of an American Legend
 2010 Seymour Medal for Satchel: The Life and Times of an American Legend

References

External links
 Official website
 Publisher profile at Penguin Random House

Booknotes: On The Father of Spin: Edward L. Bernays & The Birth of Public Relations (Sep. 20, 1998).

Interviews
Interview with Larry Tye about Bobby Kennedy: The making of a liberal icon on NPR's Fresh Air with guest host Dave Davies.
 Interview with Larry Tye about Satchel: The Life and Times of an American Legend on NPR's Fresh Air with guest host Dave Davies.
 Interview with Larry Tye and Kitty Dukakis about Shock: The Healing Power of Electroconvulsive Therapy on NPR's Fresh Air with Terry Gross.
 Interview with Larry Tye about Rising From the Rails: Pullman Porters and the Making of the Black Middle Class on NPR's Fresh Air with Terry Gross.

American male journalists
Nieman Fellows
American non-fiction writers
Living people
Historians of public relations
Year of birth missing (living people)